The 1986–87 Auburn Tigers men's basketball team represented Auburn University in the 1986–87 college basketball season. The team's head coach was Sonny Smith, who was in his ninth season at Auburn. The team played their home games at Memorial Coliseum in Auburn, Alabama. They finished the season 18–13, 9–9 in SEC play. They defeated Kentucky to advance to the semifinals  of the SEC tournament where they lost to Alabama. They received an at-large bid to the NCAA tournament where they defeated San Diego to advance to the Second Round where they lost to Indiana.

The team lost Chuck Person to graduation and the NBA, and tried to offset the loss with sophomore transfer Aundrae Davis from West Virginia, but Davis was dismissed by coach Smith late in the season for violation of team rules.

Nevertheless, the team had a solid core with senior guards Gerald White and Frank Ford, junior forward Chris Morris, junior center Jeff Moore, and sophomore forward Mike Jones.

Roster

Schedule and results

|-
!colspan=12 style=| Regular season

|-
!colspan=12 style=| SEC Tournament

|-
!colspan=12 style=| NCAA Tournament

Rankings

References

Auburn Tigers men's basketball seasons
Auburn
Auburn
Auburn Tigers
Auburn Tigers